Dame Margaret Agnes Davidson DBE DStJ ( Feilding; 21 April 1871 – 14 October 1964) was the British wife of the Colonial Governor of New South Wales, Sir Walter Edward Davidson. She was named Dame Commander of the Order of the British Empire for her work with the Red Cross Society and the Scouting and Girl Guides in New South Wales.

Background
Born Margaret Agnes Feilding, she was the daughter of General Hon. Sir Percy Robert Basil Feilding (1827–1904) and Lady Louisa Isabella Harriet Thynne (died 26 June 1919). She married Sir Walter Edward Davidson on 21 October 1907, and was thereafter styled as Lady Davidson. In 1918, Davidson was invested as a Dame Commander of the Order of the British Empire (DBE) in her own right, and later as a Dame of Grace, Order of St. John of Jerusalem. She was thereafter styled as Dame Margaret Davidson.

Legacy
Lady Davidson Hospital, Turramurra
Lady Davidson Circuit, Forestville, New South Wales

See also
 Scouting and Guiding in New South Wales
 Women's Patriotic Association

Sources
 Charles Mosley, editor, Burke's Peerage, Baronetage & Knightage, 107th edition, 3 volumes (Wilmington, Delaware, U.S.: Burke's Peerage (Genealogical Books) Ltd, 2003), volume 1, page 1087.

External links
Power Museum website
New South Wales government archives
Archive, news.google.com. Accessed 20 December 2022.

1871 births
1964 deaths
British expatriates in Australia
People from New South Wales
Dames Commander of the Order of the British Empire
Dames of Grace of the Order of St John
Place of birth missing
Place of death missing
Wives of knights